Karen Richardson is an American executive. Her 30-year career in the software business includes positions in several companies.

Career 

Richardson sits on several corporate boards including BP, the British energy company;Exponent, a Silicon Valleybased engineering and scientific consulting company; States Title, which uses machine learning to automate real estate closings, and Artius Capital, a special-purpose acquisition company.

Richardson was a member of the board of directors of BT Group plc. from November 2011 to July 2018 and payment-processing company Worldpay from 2016 to 2019, when it was sold to FIS for $43 billion.

Richardson was named among the "100 most influential women in tech" by https://hottopics.ht/ in 2015.

Richardson was a board member of VirtuOz until January 2013, when the company was purchased by Nuance Communications. She was on the advisory board of Proofpoint Inc., a provider of email security and compliance products and was chairwoman of the board of directors of San Francisco-based Hi5 Networks Inc. from 2008 until December 2011, when the company was purchased by social networker Tagged Inc. Richardson has also sat on the boards of HackerRank, a technology company that develops competitive programming challenges, and i2, a Silver Lake-owned developer of investigative analysis software, until the company was sold to IBM in October 2011. She also served on the board of Ayasdi before it was sold, and on the advisory board of Convercent until its sale to OneTrust in 2021.

Richardson is a former adviser to Silver Lake Partners, a private equity investment firm. She also is a former member of the board of the San Francisco Opera, which she joined as part of a push by that institution to include more technology leaders. She also serves on the advisory board of the Stanford Technology Ventures Program at Stanford University.

Previously, Richardson served as chief executive of E.piphany, a developer of customer relationship management software. She also held several senior sales positions at Netscape Communications Corp. from 1995–1998. As executive vice president of sales at Netscape, Richardson concentrated on markets such as telecommunications and financial services and the development of new markets. Prior to her position at Netscape, Richardson was VP of Worldwide Sales at Collabra Software, Inc., and worked for four years with Lotus Development Corporation in a variety of sales and marketing roles as well as at cc:Mail and 3Com Corporation.

Richardson holds a BS in Industrial Engineering from Stanford University and award distinctions from the Stanford Industrial Engineering Department and the American Institute of Industrial Engineers (AIIE).

Personal life 
Her grandfather was a farmer from Saskatchewan who graduated with a Ph.D. in chemistry from Stanford; her mother entered Stanford at 16 to study mathematics, and her father is also a Stanford alumnus.  She is married to Jon Rubinstein, former co-CEO of investment firm Bridgewater Associates;

References

American computer businesspeople
British Telecom people
Silver Lake (investment firm) people
Living people
Place of birth missing (living people)
Year of birth missing (living people)
Stanford University alumni
American women chief executives
American technology chief executives
21st-century American women